The 1956 Long Beach State 49ers football team represented Long Beach State College—now known as California State University, Long Beach—as an independent during the 1956 NCAA College Division football season. Led by second-year head coach Mike DeLotto, the 49ers compiled a record of 5–3. The team played home games at Veterans Memorial Stadium adjacent to the campus of Long Beach City College in Long Beach, California.

Schedule

References

Long Beach State
Long Beach State 49ers football seasons
Long Beach State 49ers football